Camp Four on Campbell Farm, about  from Fort Smith, Montana, is nationally significant for its association with Thomas D. Campbell, "once the world's largest wheat farmer", and "a pioneer in industrialized corporate farming methods."  It is the best preserved of two permanent camps, which along with six temporary camps, served the wheat farm during the period from 1918 to the 1960s.

It was listed on the National Register of Historic Places in 1992.  It has 12 buildings and three other structures, including five bunkhouses, two commissaries, a workshop, a water tank, a "cowboy house" and an "oil house."

See also
Thomas D. Campbell House, in Grand Forks, North Dakota, log cabin and wood-frame house that was Thomas Campbell's childhood home, also NRHP-listed

References

External links
Campbell Farming Corporation Camp Four, at Big Horn County Historical Museum and Visitor Center

Farms on the National Register of Historic Places in Montana
Residential buildings on the National Register of Historic Places in Montana
National Register of Historic Places in Big Horn County, Montana
1920 establishments in Montana
Buildings and structures completed in 1920
Wheat production